Kommunarka is a Moscow Metro station on the Sokolnicheskaya line. It was opened on 20 June 2019, along with Filatov Lug, Prokshino, and Olkhovaya. and became the southwestern terminus of the line, after Olkhovaya station. Kommunarka became the 232nd station of the Moscow Metro.

It is in the Kommunarka area of Sosenskoye Settlement in the Novomoskovsky Administrative Okrug southwest of Moscow. It has become the southern terminus of the line.

History
The city government decided to extend the line to Stolbovo in February 2016; an unexpected decision given that the city initially planned to extend the line only to Filatov Lug. The initial cost of the line was about 45 billion rubles. In July 2017, the city government confirmed that the extension would move forward, allowing construction to continue.

In March 2017, the city began clearing space around the planned station to accommodate the construction.

The station's working name during most of construction was Stolbovo. This derived from the former village of Stolbovo, which became part of the current settlement when it was incorporated into the City of Moscow from Moscow Oblast.

Design and Layout
Kommunarka is at the intersection of the Solntsevo-Butovo-Varshavskoye shosse highway and the Ostafyevo International Airport section of the Moscow Ring Road. It has two lobbies, one that exits across the highway via an underground pedestrian walkway, and a second that leads to a future station on the planned Kommunarskaya line.

References 

Sokolnicheskaya Line
Moscow Metro stations
Railway stations in Russia opened in 2019
Railway stations located underground in Russia